"Strani amori'" (English: Strange loves) is a song by Italian singer Laura Pausini, released in February 1994 as the first single from her second studio album, Laura.

Written by Angelo Valsiglio, Roberto Buti, Cheope, Marco Marati and Francesco Tanini, the song was first performed by Laura Pausini during the 44th Sanremo Music Festival in February 1994, where it placed third in a field of twenty, behind Aleandro Baldi's "Passerà" and Giorgio Faletti's "Signor tenente".

The song was later translated in Spanish and included in Pausini's self-titled compilation album, released in 1994 for the Hispanic market. This version of the song, titled "Amores extraños", peaked at number one on the Billboard Latin Pop Songs chart.

Both "Strani amori" and "Amores extraños" were re-recorded for Pausini's 2001 compilation album The Best of Laura Pausini: E ritorno da te / Lo mejor de Laura Pausini – Volveré junto a ti and for her 2013 compilation album 20 – The Greatest Hits / 20 – Grandes Éxitos.

Cover version
After its release, in 1994, Brazilian singer Renato Russo recorded a cover version of the song for his album Equilíbrio distante. Years after Russo's death, in 2010, Laura re-recorded the song and mixed it with the old original Russo cover version, in the posthumous release Renato Russo: Duetos.

In 1994, Puerto Rican singer Olga Tañón included a cover of "Amores extraños" on her album Siente el amor.... In 1995, the song was also recorded by Rubby Perez for his self-titled album. His version of the song peaked at number 15 on the Billboard Latin Tropical Airplay chart.

Track listings

Charts

Weekly charts

"Strani amori"

"Amores extraños"

Year-end charts

"Strani amori"

"Amores extraños"

Certifications

References

1994 songs
Italian-language songs
Spanish-language songs
Laura Pausini songs
Pop ballads
Sanremo Music Festival songs
Songs written by Cheope
1990s ballads
Songs written by Angelo Valsiglio
Compagnia Generale del Disco singles